Miloš Miljanić (born 1960) is a Serbian former football manager and player.

Personal life
Miloš is the son of former Real Madrid and Red Star Belgrade manager Miljan Miljanić.

External links
http://www.elsalvador.com/noticias/2003/06/12/deportes/depor7.shtml
http://www.elgrafico.com/index.php?dest=true&art=28627
http://www.elgrafico.com/milos-miljanic---continuare-lo-que-deje-antes-
http://www.culebritamacheteada.com.sv/milos-miljanic-idas-y-regresos-al-futbol-salvadoreno/

1960 births
Living people
Footballers from Belgrade
Association football defenders
Serbian footballers
Serbian football managers
C.D. Águila managers
C.D. Luis Ángel Firpo managers
Expatriate football managers in El Salvador